Erwin Huber (5 April 1907 – 23 May 2003) was a German athlete. He competed in the men's decathlon at the 1928 Summer Olympics and the 1936 Summer Olympics.

References

1907 births
2003 deaths
Athletes (track and field) at the 1928 Summer Olympics
Athletes (track and field) at the 1936 Summer Olympics
German decathletes
Olympic athletes of Germany
Sportspeople from Karlsruhe